The 9th Parliament of Singapore was a meeting of the Parliament of Singapore. Its first session commenced on 26 May 1997 and was prorogued on 8 September 1999. It commenced its second session on 4 October 1999 and was dissolved on 18 October 2001.

The members of the 9th Parliament were elected in the 1997 general election. Parliament was controlled by a People's Action Party majority, led by Prime Minister Goh Chok Tong and his cabinet. The Speaker was Tan Soo Khoon.

Officeholders 

 Speaker: Tan Soo Khoon (PAP)
 Deputy Speaker:
 Eugene Yap Giau Cheng (PAP)
 Prime Minister: Goh Chok Tong (PAP)
 Deputy Prime Minister:
 Lee Hsien Loong (PAP)
 Tony Tan (PAP)
 Leader of the Opposition: Chiam See Tong (SPP)
 Leader of the House: Wong Kan Seng (PAP)
 Party Whip of the People's Action Party: Lee Boon Yang
 Deputy Party Whip of the People's Action Party:
 Goh Chee Wee
 Ong Chit Chung

Composition

Members

Elected Members of Parliament 
This is the list of members of the 9th Parliament of Singapore elected in the 1997 general election.

Non-constituency Members of Parliament 
One Non-constituency Member of Parliament seat was allocated in the 9th Parliament of Singapore.

Nominated Members of Parliament 

 Chiang See Ngoh, from 1 October 1997 until 1 October 2001
 Chuang Shaw Peng, from 1 October 1997 until 1 October 1999
 Gerard Ee, from 1 October 1997 until 1 October 2001
 Lee Tsao Yuan, from 1 October 1997 until 1 October 1999
 Shriniwas Rai, from 1 October 1997 until 1 October 1999
 Cyrille Tan Soo Leng, from 1 October 1997 until 1 October 1999
 Tay Beng Chuan, from 1 October 1997
 Simon Tay, from 1 October 1997
 Zulkifli B. Baharudin, from 1 October 1997 until 1 October 2001
 Goh Chong Chia, from 1 October 1999
 Jennifer Lee Gek Choo, from 1 October 1999
 Noris Ong Chin Guan, from 1 October 1999
 Thomas Thomas, from 1 October 1999
 Braema Mathiaparanam, from 1 October 2001
 Chandra Mohan K Nair, from 1 October 2001

Vacant seats

References 

Parliament of Singapore